Asefabad (also Romanized as Āşefābād) is a village in Rahmatabad Rural District, Zarqan District, Shiraz County, Fars Province, Iran. At the 2006 census, its population was 112, in 30 families.

References 

Populated places in Zarqan County